Neopentyl glycol diglycidyl ether (NPGDGE) is an organic chemical in the glycidyl ether family. It is aliphatic and a colorless liquid. It has the formula C11H20O4 and the CAS registry number of 17557-23-2. It has two oxirane groups per molecule. Its principle use is in modifying epoxy resins.

It is REACH registered. The IUPAC name is 2-[[2,2-dimethyl-3-(oxiran-2-ylmethoxy)propoxy]methyl]oxirane.

Synthesis
Neopentyl glycol and epichlorohydrin are reacted in the presence of a Lewis acid catalyst to form a halohydrin. This is followed by washing with sodium hydroxide in dehydrochlorination step. This forms Neopentyl glycol diglycidyl ether. The waste products are water and sodium chloride and excess caustic soda. One of the quality control tests would involve measuring the Epoxy value by determination of the epoxy equivalent weight.

Uses
A key use is modifying the viscosity and properties of epoxy resins. As an Epoxy modifier it is classed as an epoxy reactive diluent. which may then be formulated into CASE applications: Coatings,  Adhesives, Sealants and Elastomers and composite materials. These uses include cationic polymerization reactions. The use of the diluent does effect mechanical properties and microstructure of epoxy resins. It is also used to synthesize other molecules.

Toxicity
NPGDGE toxicity is fairly well understood. It is classed as a skin irritant and skin sensitizer.

See also
 Epoxide
 Glycidol

References

Further reading

External links
 Hexion difunctional epoxy diluents
 Denacol epoxy diluent range
  Aalchem NPGDGE
 Cargill Reactive diluents

Glycidyl ethers
Reactive diluents